Tanzania Women Bank Limited (TWBL) is a Tanzanian bank that specialises in providing financial services to women. It is listed as a "Registered Financial Institution" by the Bank of Tanzania, the central bank and national banking regulator.

Overview
The bank is a small financial institution in Tanzania. , the bank's shareholders' equity was valued at TSh 8.5 billion (approx. US$4 million).

History
The idea to start a Women's Bank in Tanzania began in 1999, when a number of female entrepreneurs approached the then President of Tanzania, Benjamin William Mkapa, with the idea. Eight years later, in 2007, the Tanzania Women's Bank Limited (TWBL) was created. The bank officially opened for business on 28 July 2009. TWB's aim is to empower women economically and socially. It serves all segments of society including low income earners, large corporations and small and medium enterprises (SMEs).

Ownership
From the time of its creation, in 2007, as a private limited liability company, 97% of the shareholding in the stock of the bank was owned by the Government of Tanzania. The remaining 3% was owned by private institutions and individuals. In August 2012, the Tanzanian government began the process of listing the shares of the bank's stock on the Dar es Salaam Stock Exchange (DSE), through the issuance of an initial public offering (IPO). The bank changed its official name to Tanzania Women's Bank Public Limited Company, in keeping with the change in ownership to a public limited liability company. The shares of TWB were listed on the DSE in 2012.

Branch network
, the bank maintains branches at the following locations:

 Mkwepu Branch - Old Post Office Building, Mkwepu Street, Dar es Salaam
 Kariakoo Branch - Aggrey Likoma Street, Dar es Salaam
 Dodoma Branch - Posta/TTCL Building, Railway Road, Dodoma
 Mwanza Branch - Old Post Office Building, Posta Road, Mwanza

See also

References

External links
 Website of Bank of Tanzania
 Partial List of Licensed Commercial Banks In Tanzania
 Tanzania Women's Bank To List On DSE In 2012

 
Economy of Tanzania
Banks established in 2007
2007 establishments in Tanzania